This list of Juilliard School alumni contains links to Wikipedia articles about notable alumni and teachers of the Juilliard School in New York City.

Notable alumni

Dance division
The dance division was established in 1951. It offers a four-year Bachelor of Fine Arts (BFA) degree or a diploma. In prior years it also awarded B.S. and M.S. degrees.

 Robert Battle (BFA 1994) – choreographer
 Phoebe Cates – actress, singer, entrepreneur
 Brennan Clost (2016) – dancer, actor
 Carla DeSola (1960) – pioneer of liturgical dance
 Robert Garland (BFA 1983) – choreographer
 Marcia Jean Kurtz (BS 1964) – actress, director
 Daniel Lewis (1967) dancer, choreographer, teacher
 Lar Lubovitch (1964) – choreographer
 Robert LuPone – actor
 Bradon McDonald (1997, dance) – dancer, choreographer, fashion designer
 Ohad Naharin (1977) – dancer, choreographer
 Bebe Neuwirth (1977, dance) – actress, singer, dancer
 Henning Rübsam (BFA 1991, dance) – choreographer
 Rina Schenfeld – choreographer, dancer
 Adam Shankman – dancer, director
 Elizabeth Sung (BFA, dance) – actress
 Paul Taylor (BS 1953, dance) – choreographer
 Lea Ved (BFA 2013, dance) – choreographer and contemporary dancer

Drama division
The drama division was founded in 1968. Those who complete the four-year program receive either a Bachelor of Fine Arts (BFA) degree, a Master of Fine Arts (MFA) degree (starting Fall 2012), or a diploma. Each year's class is identified by a group number: Group 1 started in 1968 and graduated in 1972; Group 46 includes students completing their fourth year in 

Jane Adams (Group 18, 1989)
Frankie J. Alvarez (Group 39, 2010)
Robert Aramayo (Group 44, 2015)
Michael Arden (Group 34, 2001–2003)
Tony Azito (Group 1, 1968–1970)
Morena Baccarin (Group 29, 2000)
David Aaron Baker (Group 19, 1990)
Lisa Banes (Group 6, 1977)
Christine Baranski (Group 3, 1974)
Charlie Barnett (Group 39, 2010)
Michael Beach (Group 15, 1986)
Nicole Beharie (Group 36, 2007)
Wes Bentley (Group 29, 1996–1997)
Casey Biggs (Group 6, 1977)
Ryan Bittle (Group 31, 2002)
Ben Bodé (Group 19, 1990)
Steven Boyer (Group 30, 2001)
Andre Braugher (Group 17, 1988)
Daniel Breaker (Group 31, 2002)
Danielle Brooks (Group 40, 2011)
Bill Camp (Group 18, 1989)
Michael Chernus (Group 28, 1999)
Mary Chieffo (Group 44, 2015)
Christian Camargo (Group 25, 1996)
Jeffrey Carlson (Group 30, 2001)
Jennifer Carpenter (Group 31, 2002)
Jessica Chastain (Group 32, 2003)
Fala Chen (Group 47, 2018)
Bryan Cogman  (Group 30, 2001)
Jessie Collins (Group 34, 2005)
Lynn Collins (Group 28, 1999)
David Conrad (Group 25, 1992–1995)
Frances Conroy (Group 6, 1977)
Kevin Conroy (Group 6, 1977)
David Corenswet (Group 45, 2016)
Marcia Cross (Group 13, 1984)
Wallis Currie-Wood (Group 43, 2014)
Kevin Daniels (Group 27, 1998)
Keith David (Group 8, 1979)
Viola Davis (Group 22, 1993)
John de Lancie (Group 5, 1976)
David Denman (Group 26, 1997)
Reed Diamond (Group 20, 1991)
Megan Dodds (Group 24, 1995)
Harris Doran (Group 29, 1996–1998)
Mike Doyle (Group 27, 1998)
Adam Driver (Group 38, 2009)
Gabriel Ebert (Group 38, 2009)
James Eckhouse (Group 9, 1980)
Edward Edwards (Group 4, 1975)
Gretchen Egolf (Group 24, 1995)
Nelsan Ellis (Group 33, 2004)
Betty Gabriel (Group 43, 2014)
Boyd Gaines (Group 8, 1979)
Megan Gallagher (Group 11, 1982)
Michael Genet (Group 9, 1980)
Thomas Gibson (Group 14, 1985)
Michel Gill (Group 14, 1985)
Heather Goldenhersh (Group 24, 1995)
Enid Graham (Group 21, 1992); 1998 Tony nominee
Kelsey Grammer (Group 6, 1973–1975)
Shalita Grant (Group 39, 2010)
Dan Green
Lynnie Greene (Group 5, 1972–1975)
John Gremillion (Group 17, 1986–1988)
Gerald Gutierrez (Group 1, 1972)
Brandon Micheal Hall (Group 44, 2015)
LisaGay Hamilton (Group 18, 1989)
Evan Handler (Group 12, 1979–1981)
Brian Hargrove (Group 10, 1981)
James Harper (Group 5, 1976)
Harriet Sansom Harris (Group 6, 1977)
Maya Hawke (Group 49, 2016–2017)
Corey Hawkins (Group 40, 2011)
Michael Hayden (Group 21, 1992)
Stephen McKinley Henderson (Group 1, 1968–1970)
Benjamin Hendrickson (Group 1, 1972)
Patrick Heusinger (Group 33, 2004)
John Benjamin Hickey (Group 18, 1989)
Nancy Hower (Group 21, 1992)
Glenn Howerton (Group 29, 2000)
Janet Hubert (Group 7; left)
David Hunt
William Hurt (Group 5, 1976)
Doug Hutchison (left)
Oscar Isaac (Group 34, 2005)
Gillian Jacobs (Group 33, 2004)
Peter Jacobson (Group 20, 1991)
Gregory Jbara (Group 15, 1986)
Penny Johnson Jerald (Group 11, 1982)
Jack Kenny (Group 11, 1982)
Matt Keeslar (Group 24, 1995)
Val Kilmer (Group 10, 1981)
Perry King (Group 3, 1970–1971)
Kevin Kline (Group 1, 1972)
Joaquina Kalukango (Group 40, 2011)
Linda Kozlowski (Group 10, 1981)
Erin Krakow (Group 35, 2005)
Stephen Kunken (Group 26, 1997)
Eriq La Salle (Group 13, 1980–1982)
 Jayme Lawson (Group 48, 2019)
Laura-Leigh (Group 37, 2008)
James Hiroyuki Liao (Group 34, 2004)
Laura Linney (Group 19, 1990)
Cleavon Little
Vella Lovell (Group 44, 2015)
Justine Lupe (Group 40, 2011)
Patti LuPone (Group 1, 1972)
Luke Macfarlane (Group 32, 2003)
Anthony Mackie (Group 30, 2001)
Nate Mann (Group 48, 2019)
Kenneth Marshall (Group 6, 1977)
James Marsters (Group 15, 1982–1984)
Elizabeth Marvel (Group 21, 1992)
Danny Mastrogiorgio (Group 23, 1994)
Patricia Mauceri (Group 3, 1974)
Leigh McCloskey (Group 6, 1973–1975)
Kelly McGillis (Group 12, 1983)
Elizabeth McGovern (Group 12, 1979–1981)
Robert Duncan McNeill (Group 17, 1984–1986)
John McTiernan (Group 2, left)
Nick Mennell (Group 34, 2004)
Lindsay G. Merrithew (Group 15, 1982–1984)
Jim Moody (Group 1, 1972)
Gregory Mosher (Group 4, 1971–1974)
Kurt Naebig (Group 19, 1990)
Tim Blake Nelson (Group 19, 1990)
Seth Numrich (Group 36, 2007)
Clancy O'Connor (Group 35, 2005)
Michael O'Hare
Caitlin O'Heaney (Group 3, 1974)
Nancy Opel (Group 9, 1980)
Lee Pace (Group 30, 2001)
Teyonah Parris (Group 38, 2009)
Lux Pascal (Group 52, 2023)
Mandy Patinkin (Group 5, 1972–1974)
Lisa Pelikan (Group 6, 1977)
Paul Perri (Group 6, 1977)
Wendell Pierce (Group 14, 1985)
Carrie Preston (Group 23, 1994)
Lonny Price (Group 10, 1977–1978)
Saundra Quarterman (Group 19, 1990)
Sara Ramirez (Group 26, 1997)
Wes Ramsey (Group 29, 2000)
Gayle Rankin (Group 40, 2011)
Ben Rappaport (Group 37, 2008)
Monica Raymund (Group 37, 2008)
Elizabeth Reaser (Group 28, 1999)
Serena Reeder (Group 34, 2005)
Christopher Reeve (Group 4, 1973–1975)
Marianne Rendón (Group 45, 2016) 
Ving Rhames (Group 12, 1983)
Tom Robbins (Group 6, 1977)
Dallas Roberts (Group 23, 1994)
Matt Ross (Group 22, 1993)
Jed Rubenfeld (Group 13, 1980–1982)
Kario Salem (Group 5–7; left)
Marla Schaffel (Group 19, 1990)
Stephen Schnetzer (Group 3, 1974)
David Schramm (Group 1, 1972)
Judson Scott
Franklyn Seales (Group 3, 1974)
Matt Servitto (Group 18, 1989)
Alex Sharp (Group 43, 2014)
Michael James Shaw (Group 42, 2013)
Leslie Silva (Group 24, 1995)
Brian J. Smith (Group 36, 2007)
Norman Snow (Group 1, 1972)
Phillipa Soo (Group 41, 2012)
Kevin Spacey (Group 12, 1979–1981)
Bern Nadette Stanis (Group 3, 1971–1973)
Jack Stehlin (Group 11, 1982)
Mary Stein (Group 13, 1984)
David Ogden Stiers (Group 1, 1972)
Henry Stram (Group 6, 1977)
Ethan Strimling (Group 18, 1985–1987)
Michael Stuhlbarg (Group 21, 1992)
Jeremy Tardy (Group 42, 2013)
Jon Tenney (Group 19, 1986–1987)
Tracie Thoms (Group 30, 2001)
Auden Thornton (Group 40, 2011)
Lorraine Toussaint (Group 11, 1982)
Jeanne Tripplehorn (Group 19, 1990)
Sam Tsoutsouvas (Group 1, 1972)
Alan Tudyk (Group 26, 1993–1996)
Stephen Barker Turner (Group 23, 1994)
Michael Urie (Group 32, 2003)
Paul Michael Valley (Group 20, 1987–1990)
James Vasquez (Group 23, 1994)
Diane Venora (Group 6, 1977)
Thomas G. Waites (Group 7, 1974–1977)
Benjamin Walker (Group 33, 2004)
Jake Weber (Group 19, 1990)
Jess Weixler (Group 32, 2003)
Fred Weller (Group 21, 1988–1991)
Rutina Wesley (Group 34, 2005)
Bradley Whitford (Group 14, 1985)
Samira Wiley (Group 39, 2010)
Robin Williams (Group 6, 1973–1976)
Michael Wincott (Group 15, 1986)
C. J. Wilson (Group 23, 1994)
Mary Wiseman (Group 44, 2015)
Finn Wittrock (Group 37, 2008)
Sam Witwer (Group 29, 1996–1998)
Janet Zarish (Group 5, 1976)
Stephanie Zimbalist (Group 7, 1974–1975)

Playwrights program
The Lila Acheson Wallace American Playwrights Program is a one-year graduate level program in Juilliard's drama division. Selected playwrights invited to complete a second year may earn an Artist Diploma in Playwriting.

David Adjmi (Playwrights 2002)
David Auburn (Playwrights 1995, 1996)
Tanya Barfield (Playwrights 2001, 2002)
Stephen Belber (Playwrights 1995, 1996)
Hilary Bell
Brooke Berman (Playwrights 1998, 1999)
Julia Cho (Playwrights 2002, 2003)
Cusi Cram (Playwrights 2000)
Alexandra Cunningham (Playwrights 2000)
Bathsheba Doran (Playwrights 2005)
Ron Fitzgerald (Playwrights 1998)
Etan Frankel
Jessica Goldberg (Playwrights 1998, 1999, 2000)
Katori Hall (Playwrights 2008, 2009)
Josh Harmon (Playwrights 2012, 2013, 2014)
Samuel D. Hunter (Playwrights 2009)
Branden Jacobs-Jenkins (Playwrights 2012, 2013)
Nick Jones (Playwrights 2011)
Julia Jordan (Playwrights 1995)
Michael Lew (Playwrights 2013)
David Lindsay-Abaire (Playwrights 1997, 1998)
Martyna Majok (Playwrights 2015, 2016, 2017)
Elizabeth Meriwether (Playwrights 2007, 2008)
Janine Nabers (Playwrights 2012, 2013)
Adam Rapp (Playwrights 1999, 2000)
Dan Moses Schreier (Playwrights 2008)
Jen Silverman (Playwrights 2015)
Tommy Smith
Beau Willimon (Playwrights 2008)

Directors program
The Andrew W. Mellon Artist Diploma Program for Theatre Directors was a two-year graduate fellowship that began in 1995 (expanded to three years in 1997) and was discontinued from autumn 2006.

Sam Gold (Directors 2006)

Music division
The music division offers a four-year Bachelor of Music (BM) degree, a Master of Music (MM) degree, a Doctor of Musical Arts (DMA) degree, an Artist Diploma (AD), or a diploma. In prior years it also awarded B.S. and M.S. degrees.

 Bruce Adolphe – composer, author
 Edie Adams – singer, actress
 Sophia Agranovich (Pre-college 1973, BM  1978, MM 1979) – pianist
 Hanan Alattar – soprano
 Charlie Albright – pianist, composer
 John Aler – lyric tenor
 Susan Alexander-Max (BS 1965, MS 1966, piano) – fortepianist
 Greg Anderson (BM 2004, MM 2006, piano) – pianist, composer
 Helen Armstrong – violinist
 Şahan Arzruni (Diploma 1965, BS 1967, MS 1968, piano) – pianist
 Lera Auerbach (BM 1996, piano; MM 1999, composition) – pianist, composer
 Nathaniel Ayers (1972, double bass) – bassist
 Christian Badea - conductor
 Jenny Oaks Baker – violinist
 Chase Baird – saxophonist
 Huáscar Barradas – flautist
 Jon Batiste – pianist
 Enrique Batiz – pianist
 Jon "Bowzer" Bauman – Sha Na Na bass vocalist, classical pianist
 Larry Thomas Bell – composer
 Bob Berg – saxophonist
 Harold Blair – tenor

 Serge Blanc – violinist, conductor, academic 
 Mike Block (MM 2006) – cellist, singer, composer
 Theodore Bloomfield – conductor 
 Ronald Braunstein – conductor
 Anne Wiggins Brown – soprano
 Elizabeth Brown (MM 1977) – composer and performer
 The 5 Browns: Deondra, Desirae, Gregory, Melody, Ryan – pianists
 Sheila Browne – violist
 Leo Brouwer – guitarist, composer
 Bruce Brubaker – pianist, composer 
 David Bryan – keyboardist of Bon Jovi
 Steven Bryant – composer
 Kenji Bunch (BM 1995, MM 1997, viola; MM 1997, composition) – violist, composer
 Sara Davis Buechner (BM 1980, MM 1981, piano) – pianist, recording artist
 Igor Buketoff – conductor
 Cosmo Buono – pianist, founder of The Alexander and Buono Competitions
 Kevin Burdette – bass
 George Byrd – conductor
 Michel Camilo – jazz pianist
 John-Michael Caprio – conductor, organist
 Barry Carl – a cappella bass singer, bassist, voice-over artist
 Jonathan Carney – violinist, violist, conductor
 Cameron Carpenter (BM 2004, MM 2006, organ) – organist, composer
 Bryan Carter – drummer, vocalist, composer
 Jesse Ceci – violinist
 John Cerminaro – hornist
 David Chan (MM 1997, violin) – violinist
 Sarah Chang – violinist
 Jiafeng Chen – violinist
 Robert Chen – violinist
 Dan Chmielinski – jazz bassist
 Jennifer Choi – composer, violinist, member of Ethel string quartet
 Timothy Chooi – violinist
 Kyung-wha Chung – violinist
 Myung-whun Chung – conductor, pianist
 Van Cliburn – pianist
 Pamela Coburn – soprano
 Dan Coleman – composer
 James Conlon – conductor
 Bill Conti – composer
 Chick Corea (1961, piano) – jazz pianist
 Robert Craft – conductor, music writer 
 John Creswell – jazz musician
 Miles Davis – jazz trumpeter (three semester)
 Netania Davrath – soprano
 Annamary Dickey – soprano
 Glenn Dicterow – violinist
 Alfredo Diez Nieto – Cuban composer, conductor and professor
 Orlando DiGirolamo – jazz accordionist, composer
 David Dubal – pianist, teacher, author, broadcaster, painter (1961)
 Alexandra du Bois – composer
 Lawrence Dutton (BM 1977, MM 1978, viola) – violist
 James Ehnes – violinist
 Ruby Elzy – soprano
 Michael Endres – pianist
 Damien Escobar- Violinist
 Faith Esham – soprano
 Jonathan Estabrooks – baritone
 Eric Ewazen – composer
 JoAnn Falletta – conductor, guitarist
 Ying Fang – soprano
 Ralph Farris – composer, conductor, violist, violinist, co-founder of Ethel string quartet
 Alan Feinberg – pianist
 Wilhelmenia Fernandez (BM Voice) – soprano, actress
 Arthur Ferrante – pianist
 Brian T. Field – composer
 Renée Fleming – soprano
 Mario Frangoulis – tenor
 Gerald Fried – composer
 Lucas Vidal – composer
 David Friedkin – writer, director, producer
 Kenneth Fuchs – composer (MM, 1983; DMA, 1988; 2018 GRAMMY Award, Best Classical Compendium)
 Kevin R. Gallagher – guitarist
 David Garrett – violinist
 Eliza Garth – pianist
 Tim Genis – timpanist
 Ariana Ghez – oboist
 Lawrence Gilliard Jr. – actor
 Ola Gjeilo — composer, pianist, arranger
 Michael Giacchino – composer
 Alan Gilbert – conductor
 Herschel Burke Gilbert – composer
 Wallis Giunta – mezzo-soprano
 Philip Glass – composer
 David Golub – pianist
 Eddie Gómez – jazz bassist
 Matt Good – tubist
 Midori Goto – violinist
 Jason Grant – singer
 Alan Greenspan – clarinetist, former chair of the Federal Reserve Board
 Henry Grimes – double bassist
 Paul Groves – tenor
 Yang Guang – mezzo-soprano
 Horacio Gutiérrez – pianist
 Bruce Haack – pioneer in electronic music
 Andreas Haefliger – pianist
 Daron Hagen – composer, pianist, conductor, stage director
 B. H. Haggin – music critic
 Tamar Halperin – pianist, harpsichordist
 Marvin Hamlisch – composer, pianist
 Lynn Harrell – cellist
 Edward W. Hardy – violinist, violist, composer
 Margaret Rosezarian Harris – conductor, composer
 Miguel Harth-Bedoya – conductor
 Julius Hegyi – violinist, conductor
 Luther Henderson – arranger, composer, orchestrator
 Christina Henson Hayes- Soprano, music director, AD Opera for Humanity, AD Outlaw Opera Australia
 Freddie Herko – musician, dancer
 Bernard Herrmann – composer
 Natalie Hinderas – pianist, composer
 Yoshihisa Hirano – composer
 Moses Hogan – composer, conductor, arranger of choral music and spirituals
 Stephen Hough – pianist
 Helen Huang – pianist
 Frank Huang – violinist
 Hao Huang – pianist
 Monica Huggett – baroque violinist
 Nobuko Imai – violist
 Mattias Jacobsson – guitarist
 Morgan James – singer, actress
 Joseph Kalichstein – pianist
 Sharon Kam – clarinetist
 Michael Kamen – composer, oboist
 Hyo Kang – violinist
 Paul Kantor – violinist
 Jozef Kapustka – pianist
 Laura Karpman – composer
 Louis Kaufman – violinist
 Martin Kennedy – composer, pianist
 Matthew Kennedy – pianist
 Nigel Kennedy – violinist
 Nina Kennedy – pianist
 Jeffrey Khaner – flutist
 Edith Killgore Kirkpatrick – music educator
 Benny Kim – violinist
 Bomsori Kim (MM 2016, AD 2018, violin) – violinist 
 Chin Kim – violinist
 David Kim – violinist
 Coya Knutson – Minnesota U.S. Representative
 Wladimir Jan Kochanski – pianist
 Catherine Ransom Karoly – flutist
 Rosemary Kuhlmann – mezzo-soprano
 Fredell Lack – violinist
 Kenneth Lampl – composer
 Kay Lande - composer and singer
 Albert Laszlo – bassist
 Manny Laureano – trumpet
 Paul Lavalle – conductor, arranger, radio show personality
 Dorothy Lawson – cellist, composer, co-founder of Ethel (string quartet)
 Trey Chui-yee Lee – cellist
 Adele Leigh – English operatic soprano
 Isabel Leonard – mezzo-soprano
 Pete Levin – keyboards, horn
 Sir Gilbert Levine– conductor
James Levine (Diploma 1963, orchestral conducting) – conductor
 Cho-Liang Lin – violinist
 Lowell Liebermann – composer, conductor, pianist
 Jens Lindemann – trumpet
 Ching-Yun Hu (Pre-College 1999, BM 2003, MM 2005) – pianist
 Mats Lidström – solo cellist, chamber musician, composer, teacher, publisher
 Robert Lipsett – violinist
 Andrew Litton – pianist, conductor
 Ricardo Llorca – composer
 Nicola Loud – violinist
 Kevin Kwan Loucks – pianist, arts entrepreneur 
 Yo-Yo Ma (Professional Studies 1972, cello) – cellist
 Teo Macero – jazz composer, producer
 Tod Machover – composer
 John Mackey (MM 1997, composition) – composer
 Henry Mancini – composer, conductor
 Jon Manasse – clarinetist
 Eugenia Manolidou – composer, conductor
 Catherine Manoukian – violinist
 Barry Manilow – singer & songwriter
 Edvin Marton – violinist
 Wynton Marsalis – trumpeter
 Ana María Martínez – opera singer
 Gulnara Mashurova – harpist
 Joyce Mathis – soprano
 Audra McDonald (BM 1993, voice) – singer and actress
 Christian McBride – jazz bassist
 Susann McDonald – harpist
 Robert McDuffie – violinist
 Steven Mercurio – composer, conductor
 Anne Akiko Meyers – violinist 
 Stefan Milenković – violinist
 Jeffery Miller – trombonist
 Meagan Miller – opera singer
 Stephanie Mills – singer
 Eric Milnes – harpsichordist, organist and conductor
 Leon Milo – composer, percussionist and sound artist
 Alexander Mishnaevski – violinist
 Beata Moon – composer, pianist
 Charlotte Moorman – cellist
 Alan Morrison – organist
 Mark Morton – bassist
 Nico Muhly – composer, pianist
 Simon Nabatov – pianist, composer
 Hiroko Nakamura – pianist
 Christina Naughton – pianist
 Michelle Naughton – pianist
 Paul Neebe – trumpeter
 Pascal Nemirovski – pianist
 Takako Nishizaki – violinist
 Linda November – singer
 Julia Nussenbaum – violinist, also known as Tania Lubova
 Constantine Orbelian – conductor, pianist
 Noriko Ogawa – pianist
 Santos Ojeda – pianist
 America Olivo – mezzo-soprano, actor
 Margaret Saunders Ott – pianist
 Peter Oundjian – violinist, conductor
 Alex Panamá – composer
 Dorothy Papadakos – MM, organ
 Anthony & Joseph Paratore – piano duo
 Juliette Passer – music director
 Margaret Pardee – violinist
 Rene Paulo – pianist
 Nick Perito – composer, arranger, music director, performer
 Marina Piccinini – flutist
 Miguel Franz Pinto – vocal coach, conductor, pianist
 Hila Plitmann – opera singer, soprano
 Itzhak Perlman – violinist
 Susanna Phillips – opera singer, soprano
 Christina Petrowska-Quilico – pianist
 Ashan Pillai – violist
 Daniel Pollack – pianist
 Leontyne Price – soprano
 Tito Puente – Latin jazz and mambo musician
 Michael Rabin – violinist
 Valentin Radu – pianist/organist, conductor
 André Raphel – conductor
 Behzad Ranjbaran – composer
 Einojuhani Rautavaara – composer
 Steve Reich – composer
 Carole Dawn Reinhart – trumpet, professor in Vienna
 Madelyn Renee – soprano
 Gerardo Ribeiro – violinist
 Fernando Rivas – composer, sex offender
 Graciela Rivera – soprano
 Jennifer Rivera – mezzo-soprano
 Marco Rizo – composer, pianist
 Julius Rodriguez – pianist, drummer
 Neil Rosenshein – tenor
 Mary Rowell – composer, violinist, co-founder of Ethel (string quartet)
 Alan Rubin – trumpeter
 John Rubinstein – composer, actor
 Jordan Rudess – pianist, Dream Theater
 Joel Ryce-Menuhin – pianist, psychologist
 Rohan Joseph de Saram – conductor
 Ezra Schabas – clarinet, saxophone, educator
 Staffan Scheja – pianist
 Peter Schickele – composer, satirist
 William Schimmel – composer, accordionist
 Charles Schlueter – trumpeter
 Stephen Schwartz (Pre-College 1964, piano)
 Gerard Schwarz – conductor
 Hazel Scott – pianist, singer
 Judson Scott – actor, pianist
 Raymond Scott – composer, bandleader, inventor
 Tony Scott – Bebop clarinetist, arranger, New World music innovator
 Alex Seaver – singer-songwriter and DJ known as Mako
 Kathryn Selby – pianist
 Gil Shaham – violinist
 Theodore Shapiro (MFA 1995, music composition)
 Alan Shulman – composer, cellist
 Tracy Silverman – violinist, composer
 Jacques Singer – conductor
 Lori Singer – cellist, actress
 Nina Simone – musician, civil rights activist
 Leonard Slatkin – conductor
 Brian Slawson – composer
 Vilem Sokol – violinist
 Lew Soloff – composer, trumpeter
 Robin Stamper – conductor, musical director, Opera Tampa
 Wim Statius Muller – composer, pianist 
 Mark Steinberg – violinist
 Albert Stern – violinist
 Paul Stetsenko – organist
 Bob Stillman (BM Piano)
 Liz Story – pianist
 Hai-Kyung Suh – pianist
 Kathleen Supové – pianist
 Akiko Suwanai – violinist
 Jeffrey Swann – pianist
 Walter Taieb – composer, conductor
 Margaret Leng Tan – pianist
 Louis Teicher – pianist
 Alfred Teltschik – pianist
 Ralph de Toledano – journalist, music critic
 Marioara Trifan – pianist, conductor
 Ahn Trio – chamber music trio
 Francesco Tristano – pianist
 Jonathan Tunick – orchestrator
 Rosalyn Tureck – pianist, harpsichordist
 Hideko Udagawa – violinist
 Leslie Uggams – actress, singer (left 1963)
 Roland and Almita Vamos – violinist, violist
 Jaap van Zweden – violinist, conductor
 Robert Vernon – violist
 F. Dudleigh Vernor – organist, composer
 Shirley Verrett – mezzo-soprano/soprano
 Joseph Villa – piano
 Verónica Villarroel – soprano
 Ezequiel Viñao – composer
 Andrew von Oeyen – pianist
 Paul Waggoner – guitarist, Between the Buried and Me
 Xun Wang – pianist
 Robert Ward – composer
 Katharine Mulky Warne – composer, founder of Milhaud Society
 Alexis Weissenberg – pianist
 June Weybright – composer, pianist
 Eric Whitacre – composer, conductor
 John Williams – composer, conductor
 Albert Cano Smit – pianist
 Meredith Willson – composer
 Ransom Wilson – flutist, conductor
 Mark Wood – electric violinist
 Phil Woods – clarinetist, saxophonist
 Joyce Yang – pianist
 Yung Wook Yoo – pianist
 Rolande Maxwell Young – composer, pianist
 Terence Yung – pianist
 Camille Zamora – soprano
 Charlotte Lois Zelka – pianist
 Bernard Zinck - violinist
 Eva Maria Zuk – pianist
 Pinchas Zukerman – violinist
 Princess Rani Vijaya Devi of Kotda Sangani & Mysore – pianist

Notable teachers 

 Samuel Adler – composer
 Bruce Adolphe – composer
 JoAnne Akalaitis – director
 Joseph Alessi – principal trombone of the New York Philharmonic
 Nancy Allen – harpist
 Baruch Arnon – piano, graduate studies, chamber music
 René Auberjonois – actor
 Emanuel Ax – pianist
 Milton Babbitt – composer
 Jon Robin Baitz – playwright
 Julius Baker – flutist
 Robert Beaser – composer
 Brian Bedford – actor
 Luciano Berio – composer, founded the Juilliard Ensemble
 Eric Bogosian – playwright
 George Frederick Boyle – pianist
 Henry Brant – composer
 William Burden – voice teacher, tenor
 Kendall Durelle Briggs – music theorist, composer
 Bruce Brubaker – pianist
 Maria Callas – opera singer
 Elliott Carter – composer
 Ron Carter – double bass
 Antonio Ciacca – business of jazz
 Timothy Cobb – double bass
 John Corigliano – composer
 Alfredo Corvino – ballet master
 Frank Damrosch – composer
 Bella Davidovich – pianist
 Colin Davis – conductor
 Giuseppe De Luca – opera singer
 Dorothy DeLay – violinist
 Patricia Delgado – ballet
 James DePreist – conductor
 David Diamond – composer
 Glenn Dicterow – violinist
 Ania Dorfmann – pianist
 Elaine Douvas – oboe
 David Dubal – pianist, teacher, author, broadcaster, painter
 Lucia Dunham – soprano
 Christopher Durang – playwright
 Sixten Ehrling – conductor
 John Erskine – pianist, composer
 Simon Estes – opera singer
 Eric Ewazen – composition
 Daniel Ferro – voice teacher
 Rudolf Firkušný – pianist
 Joseph Fuchs – violinist
 Lillian Fuchs – violist
 Ivan Galamian – violinist
 Percy Goetschius – theory and composition
 Saul Goodman – timpanist
 Sascha Gorodnitzki – pianist
 Alicia Graf Mack – dancer, director of Dance Division
 John Guare – playwright
 Gerre Hancock – organist
 William Hickey – actor
 Martha Hill – dancer, director of Dance Division
 Hanya Holm – choreographer
 John Houseman – actor, producer
 Monica Huggett – baroque violinist
 Doris Humphrey – choreographer
 Ernest Hutcheson – pianist, composer
 Sharon Isbin – classical guitar
 Paul Jacobs – organist
 Rodney Jones – guitar
 Michael Kahn – director, acting teacher
 Joseph Kalichstein – pianist
 Hyo Kang – violin
 Lewis Kaplan – violinist
 Melvin Kaplan – oboist and founder of the Vermont Mozart Festival
 Yoheved Kaplinsky – pianist
 Jeffrey Khaner – flutist
 Florence Kimball – voice
 Frank Kimbrough – pianist
 Simon Kovar – bassoonist
 Joel Krosnick – cellist
 Tony Kushner – playwright
 Kenneth Lampl – composer
 Michael Langham – actor, director
 Albert Laszlo – bassist
 Jacob Lateiner – pianist
 Judith LeClair – principal bassoonist of the New York Philharmonic
 Eugene Levinson – principal bass of the New York Philharmonic
 Frank Lévy – pianist
 Josef Lhévinne – pianist
 Rosina Lhévinne – pianist
 José Limón – choreographer
 Romulus Linney – playwright
 Gene Lockhart – actor
 Jerome Lowenthal – pianist
 Jon Manasse – clarinetist
 Robert Mann – violinist, founder and first violinist of the Juilliard String Quartet
 Adele Marcus – pianist
 Wynton Marsalis – improvisation and trumpet
 Alberta Masiello – pianist and conductor
 João Carlos Martins – pianist
 William Masselos - pianist
 Dakin Matthews – actor
 Michael Mayer – director
 Terrence McNally – playwright
 Genia Melikova – ballet
 Peter Mennin – composer
 Homer Mensch – bassist
 Jeffrey Milarsky – music director, AXIOM Ensemble
 Andrew Norman – composer
 Marsha Norman – playwright
 Orin O'Brien – double bass
 Santos Ojeda – pianist
 Margaret Pardee – violinist
 Itzhak Perlman – violinist
 Vincent Persichetti – composer
 Ashan Pillai – violist
 Matthias Pintscher – composer
 Joseph Polisi – bassoonist
 Erik Ralske – hornist 
 Behzad Ranjbaran – theory
 Nadia Reisenberg – pianist
 Ruggiero Ricci – violinist
 Christopher Rouse – composer
 Henning Rübsam – choreographer
 Michel Saint-Denis – actor, director
 Olga Samaroff – pianist
 György Sándor – pianist
 Carl Schachter – Schenkerian analyst
 Peter Schickele – composer, humorist, best known for his P. D. Q. Bach character
 William Schimmel – composer, accordionist
 Alan Schneider – director
 William Schuman – composer, winner of the Pulitzer Prize for Music, founder of the Juilliard String Quartet
 Roger Sessions – composer, winner of the Pulitzer Prize for Music
 Marian Seldes – actor
 Marcella Sembrich – voice teacher
 Oscar Shumsky – violinist
 Abbey Simon – pianist
 Liz Smith – actor
 W. Stephen Smith – voice teacher
 Bern Nadette Stanis – actor, dancer
 Anna Sokolow – choreographer
 David Soyer – cellist
 Clifton Taylor – theatrical designer
 Léon Theremin
 Andrew Thomas – composition
 Tracie Thoms – actress
 Antony Tudor – choreographer
 William Vacchiano – trumpeter
 Melinda Wagner – composer
 Wendy Wasserstein – playwright
 Grace Welsh – pianist, composer
 Earl Wild – pianist
 Teddy Wilson – pianist
 Stefan Wolpe – composer
 Oxana Yablonskaya – pianist

Resident ensembles
 American Brass Quintet *
 Juilliard String Quartet *

Presidents
 Frank Damrosch (1904–1926)
 John Erskine (1926–1937)
 Ernest Hutcheson (1937–1945)
 William Schuman (1946–1961)
 Peter Mennin (1962–1984)
 Joseph W. Polisi (1984–2018)
 Damian Woetzel (2018– )

References

 
Juilliard School